The 2023 CONCACAF U-17 Championship was the 7th edition of the CONCACAF Under-17 Championship (20th edition if all eras included), the men's under-17 international football tournament organized by CONCACAF. It was hosted by Guatemala between 11 February and 26 February 2023. The top four teams qualified for the 2023 FIFA U-17 World Cup in Peru as CONCACAF representatives.

Mexico were the defending champions, and won a fifth consecutive title.

Qualified teams 

The 41 CONCACAF teams were ranked based on the CONCACAF Men's Under-17 Ranking as of December 2019. A total of 38 teams entered the tournament. The sixteen highest-ranked entrants were exempt from qualifying and advanced directly to the group stage of the final tournament, while the lowest-ranked twenty-two entrants had to participate in qualifying, where the four group winners advanced to the round of 16 of the knockout stage of the final tournament.

Notes

Venues

Match officials 
On 31 January 2023, CONCACAF announced the list of 18 referees and 16 assistant referees appointed for the tournament.

Referees

 Ken Pennyfeather
 Norberto Da Silva
 Adonis Carrasco
 Filiberto Martínez
 José Fuentes
 Shavin Greene
 Jefferson Escobar
 Christopher Mason
 Okeito Nicholson
 Víctor Cáceres
 Daniel Quintero
 Fernando Morón
 Sanchez Bass
 Reginald Gumbs
 Sergio Rozenhaut
 Kwinsi Williams
 Joseph Dickerson
 Víctor Rivas

Assistant referees

 William Chow
 Leonel Garcia
 Lendy Taveras
 Carlos Vargas
 Cristian Alvarado
 Aczel Perez
 Luis Paz
 Kemar Gayle
 Joshua Jackson
 McKenzie Ricardo
 Berman Bermudez
 Marco Bisguerra
 Leonardo Castillo
 Michel Espinoza
 Jaden Rouse
 Jose Da Silva

Draw 
The draw for the group stage took place on 29 September 2022, at the CONCACAF Headquarters in Miami. The sixteen teams were drawn into four groups of four teams. Based on the CONCACAF Men's Under-17 Ranking, the top four ranked teams were seeded into position one of each group, while the remaining twelve teams were distributed in the other pots, as follows:

Squads 

Players born on or after 1 January 2006 are eligible to compete.

Group stage 
The top three teams in each group advanced to the round of 16, where they will be joined by the four teams advancing from the qualifying round.

The teams are ranked according to points (3 points for a win, 1 point for a draw, 0 points for a loss). If tied on points, tiebreakers will be applied in the following order:
 Greater goal difference in all group matches;
 Greater number of goals scored in all group matches;
 Greater number of points in matches between the tied teams;
 Greater goal difference in matches between the tied teams (if more than two teams finished equal on points);
 Greater number of goals scored in matches among the tied teams (if more than two teams finished equal in points);
 The lower number of points based on the number of yellow and red cards in all group matches is considered according to the following additions: 
 Drawing of lots.

All times are in GTT (UTC−6).

Group E

Group F

Group G

Group H

Knockout stage

Bracket

Round of 16

Quarter-finals
Winners qualify for 2023 FIFA U-17 World Cup.

Semi-finals

Final

Awards

Winners

The following awards were given at the conclusion of the tournament.

Golden Ball 
 Gael Álvarez

Golden Boot
 Stephano Carrillo (8 goals)

Golden Glove
 Norberto Bedolla

Fair Play

Goalscorers

Qualified teams for FIFA U-17 World Cup
The following four teams from CONCACAF qualified for the 2023 FIFA U-17 World Cup.

1 Bold indicates champions for that year. Italic indicates hosts for that year.

External links 
Under 17 – Men, CONCACAF.com

References 

2023
U-17 Championship
2023 Concacaf U-17 Championship
2023 in youth association football
2023 FIFA U-17 World Cup qualification
2023 in Guatemalan sport